Versus is a 2019 French  drama-thriller film directed by François Valla. The movie stars Jules Pélissier, Jérémie Duvall, Karidja Touré and Lola Le Lann.

Synopsis
Inspired by a true story, Achille, a handsome Parisian teenager from a wealthy family, is the victim of a violent assault. He is sent to his aunt's, Brigitte for a vacation by the sea to rebuild. There he meets an angry young man, Brian who works for the golf club. From their confrontation will spring their true nature, from their struggle will be born a killer.

Cast

Jérémie Duvall as Achille
Jules Pélissier as Brian
Karidja Touré as Camille
Lola Le Lann as Léa
Victor Belmondo as Kevin
Matilda Marty-Giraut as Noémie
Rani Bheemuck as Kali
Michaël Cohen as Léa's father
Benjamin Baffie as Gabriel
Nathalie Sportiello as Brigitte
Inès Melab as Policewoman

References

External links 
 
 
Versus - Bande-annonce VF

2019 films
French thriller films
2019 thriller films
French thriller drama films
Murder in films
2010s French films